Forsyth is a city in and the county seat of Rosebud County, Montana, United States. The population was 1,647 at the 2020 census.  Forsyth was established in 1876 as the first settlement on the Yellowstone River, and in 1882 residents named the town after General James William Forsyth who commanded Fort Maginnis, Montana during the Indian Wars and the 7th Cavalry at the Wounded Knee Massacre. The town has long been a transportation nexus, starting with steamboats on the river and progressing to the Northern Pacific Railway and Interstate 94.

History
Forsyth was established as a settlement on the Yellowstone in 1876 as a steamboat landing supporting United States Army operations in the Indian Wars.

in 1882, Thomas Alexander traded land to the Northern Pacific Railway to start the town, and developed four buildings on main street.

On April 21, 1894, several hundred men of Coxey's Army, inspired by Jacob Coxey and led by William Hogan, commandeered a Northern Pacific Railway train in Butte, Montana headed for Washington, DC. After stopping in Bozeman, they fought Federal Marshals in Billings with one man killed and several wounded. They were finally apprehended in Forsyth on April 25, by five companies of the 22nd Infantry Regiment  and Troop L, 8th Cavalry from Fort Keogh, Cheyenne soldiers known as "Casey's scouts." The incident marked one of the few instances in American history where U.S. Native American troops were used against white civilians. Although some escapes occurred, 331 of the Coxeyites were taken to Helena as prisoners.

In the 1980s Forsyth served as the home of the United States Air Force 1st Combat Evaluation Group Detachment 18, evaluating radar observability for B-52s on training runs.

Geography
Forsyth is located along the south bank of the Yellowstone River. The city is served by Interstate 94 and US routes 12 and 10.

Climate

According to the Köppen Climate Classification system, Forsyth has a cold semi-arid climate, abbreviated "BSk" on climate maps.

Demographics

2010 census
As of the census of 2010, there were 1,777 people, 807 households, and 472 families residing in the city. The racial makeup of the city was 95.0% White, 0.5% African American, 1.6% Native American, 0.8% Asian, 0.1% Pacific Islander, 0.6% from other races, and 1.5% from two or more races. Hispanic or Latino of any race were 2.4% of the population.

There were 807 households, of which 26.0% had children under the age of 18 living with them, 45.8% were married couples living together, 8.2% had a female householder with no husband present, 4.5% had a male householder with no wife present, and 41.5% were non-families. 36.6% of all households were made up of individuals, and 15.8% had someone living alone who was 65 years of age or older. The average household size was 2.15 and the average family size was 2.78.

The median age in the city was 46.4 years. 22.2% of residents were under the age of 18; 6.6% were between the ages of 18 and 24; 18.9% were from 25 to 44; 32.4% were from 45 to 64; and 20% were 65 years of age or older. The gender makeup of the city was 50.1% male and 49.9% female.

2000 census
As of the census of 2000, there were 1,944 people, 826 households, and 525 families residing in the city. The population density was 1,759.0 people per square mile (676.2/km2). There were 976 housing units at an average density of 883.1 per square mile (339.5/km2). The racial makeup of the city was 95.42% White, 0.21% African American, 2.26% Native American, 0.82% Asian, 0.31% from other races, and 0.98% from two or more races. Hispanic or Latino of any race were 1.23% of the population.

There were 826 households, out of which 29.8% had children under the age of 18 living with them, 52.7% were married couples living together, 7.4% had a female householder with no husband present, and 36.4% were non-families. 32.9% of all households were made up of individuals, and 14.4% had someone living alone who was 65 years of age or older. The average household size was 2.28 and the average family size was 2.89.

In the city, the population was spread out, with 25.1% under the age of 18, 5.4% from 18 to 24, 25.2% from 25 to 44, 27.0% from 45 to 64, and 17.4% who were 65 years of age or older. The median age was 42 years. For every 100 females there were 98.2 males. For every 100 females age 18 and over, there were 96.8 males.

The median income for a household in the city was $33,533, and the median income for a family was $44,100. Males had a median income of $36,827 versus $19,038 for females. The per capita income for the city was $17,994. About 9.4% of families and 10.5% of the population were below the poverty line, including 14.4% of those under age 18 and 11.4% of those age 65 or over.

Radio stations
 KIKC AM 1250 - Classic country (Forsyth)
 KIKC-FM FM 101.3 - Country music (Forsyth)
 KATL AM 770 - Adult Contemporary (Miles City)
 KMTA AM 1050 - Oldies (Miles City)
 KYUS-FM FM 92.3 - Adult Hits (Miles City)

Infrastructure
Tillitt Field Airport is a public use airport located 3 miles east of town.

Education
The  Forsyth High School  offers a variety classes and is developing capabilities under a technology plan to prepare its students for higher education.  The plan has been updated frequently since 1997, and features plans for maintaining internet capability, and laboratory instrument capabilities.

The Forsyth Dogies play in the 3B conference with the Baker Spartans, Colstrip Colts, Lame Deer Morningstars, Lodge Grass Indians, and St.Labre Braves.   The school colors are purple and white.

Rosebud County Library serves the area.

Notable people
 Samuel Russell Barr, Minnesota state legislator
 John Melcher, former U.S. senator, worked as a veterinarian in Forsyth and served as mayor in 1955.
 Carol Thurston, actress

See also

 List of municipalities in Montana

References

External links

 Official Forsyth Web Site (sponsored by local Chamber of Commerce)
 Historic Places near Forsyth
 Library of Congress Forsyth Publications

Cities in Rosebud County, Montana
County seats in Montana
Cities in Montana
Populated places established in 1876
1876 establishments in Montana Territory